The Dease River flows through northwestern British Columbia, Canada and is a tributary of the Liard River. The river flows  generally north-eastward, draining into the Liard River near Lower Post, British Columbia. Large sections of the river parallel the Cassiar Highway, helping to make it a popular destination for canoeists, kayakers, and rafters.

The area has a rich history.  It is important to the history of Tahltan and Kaska First Nations, who continue to reside along the river.  The first European known to have visited the river was John McLeod, a Hudson's Bay Company fur trader and explorer, in August 1831.  He named the river for Peter Warren Dease, at the time Chief factor of the Mackenzie River District of the Hudson's Bay Company.  In 1837, Robert Campbell established a Hudson's Bay Company fur trading post at Dease Lake.  The community of Dease Lake has a population of approximately 650, and is the major centre in the river's watershed.

In fiction:

In Jack London's short story, "Love of Life," the protagonist is trying to make his way to "the river Dease," where he has a cache of food and supplies hidden.

See also
Dease River First Nation

References

External links
Dease Lake community website - Provides area information and useful links

Dease River
Cassiar Country
Tributaries of the Liard River